Al-'aql al-faāl or Wahib al-suwar is a kind of reason in Islamic philosophy and psychology. It is considered acting as links between human beings and the divine. It is considered as the lowest level of celestial intelligences.

Concept 
Aql has many different meanings in Islamic philosophy and psychology. The word aql means to restrain or to tie philologically. Reason is something which prevents human from judgment and behavior. Aql gradually transformed to reason semantically. In Islamic philosophy, particularly the peripatetic school, the technical use of aql to some extent is under the affection of Greek philosophy.

Historical background 
For the first time, Al-Farabi numerated several meanings of aql in his book. Avempace sees the goal of a human and a philosopher as a connection and unity with an active intellect. Active intellect is the last emanation of intelligence which account for the forms in nature. Through active intellect we can understand what the reality of things in nature are. According to Avicenna those who could separate their souls from earthly distractions, at the same time could be united with the active intellect during a journey.

In Islamic philosophy the active intellect is connected to Neoplatonic cosmology, this intelligence is associated with the moon, the Angel Jibril or the Holy Spirit (Islam). Peripatetic philosophers in the Islamic world tries to show a Platonic version of the active intellect on the basis of which the human soul and the sensible world is united with intelligence and intelligibility.

Farabi tries to reconcile between the peripatetic attitude of active intellect with the Islamic notion of prophecy. Farabi identifies active intellect with jibril (in Islam the angel of revelation). Humans can be transformed from Aql bi-l-quwwah (potential intellect) into Aql bi-l-fi'l (actual intellect). Thereby men can be free of themselves from the darkness of ignorance. Finally aql transforms into Aql Al-mustafad (the acquired intellect). In the level that acquires intellect, aql reflects upon its own contents through inquiring among its similarities and distinction.

Characteristics 
Aql Faal has many basic roles in epistemology and psychology in Islamic philosophy, some of them are as follows:
 active intellect acted as an intellection such a way that providing forms for sublunary world
 it also transforms potential Aql to the level of  actual Aql in epistemology and sense perception
 it also enable us to separate between intelligible from Sense perception objects
 active intellect also helps to perfect human souls
 Wahib Al-suwar helps to acquiring highest of happiness
 Aql Faal also helps to immortality of souls
 active intellect helps to explain the mechanism of revelation

See also 
Active intellect
Islamic philosophy

References 

Islamic philosophy
Islamic terminology